The 2018 international cricket season was from May 2018 to September 2018. 16 Test matches, 27 One-day Internationals (ODIs) and 33 Twenty20 International (T20Is), as well as 14 Women's One Day Internationals (WODIs) and 81 Women's Twenty20 Internationals (WT20Is), were played during this period.

The season started with India leading the Test cricket rankings, England leading the ODI rankings, Pakistan leading the Twenty20 rankings, and Australia women leading the women's rankings. This season was also the first to be scheduled under the 2018–2023 Future Tours Programme. In addition, all women's Twenty20 matches played between member sides after 1 July were given full international status and classified as WT20Is, as per a decision made by the International Cricket Council (ICC) in April 2018. The first WT20Is to be classified as such under these new rules took place at the 2018 ICC Women's World Twenty20 Qualifier.

Men's international cricket started with Pakistan's tour of Ireland, which included a one-off Test match that Pakistan won. The Test match was Ireland's first. This season also included Afghanistan's first Test match and Nepal's first ODI matches. Scotland beat England for the first time in ODIs after winning the one-off ODI in Edinburgh. Scotland's innings total of 371/5 was the highest score by an Associate team against a Full Member team. In the 3rd ODI of Australia's tour of England, England scored a new record high ODI innings total of 481/6 off 50 overs.   

The qualification process for the 2023 Cricket World Cup started with the World Cricket League Division Four tournament that was held in Malaysia. Uganda and Denmark were promoted to Division Three while Vanuatu and Bermuda were relegated to Division Five.  

The qualification process for the 2020 ICC T20 World Cup continued in this season. The Africa Eastern Sub Region Qualifier was held in Rwanda and saw Kenya and Uganda qualify for the Africa Regional Qualifier. The Europe Group A, B, and C Sub Region Qualifiers were held in the Netherlands. Denmark, Germany, Guernsey, Italy, Jersey, and Norway qualified for the Europe Regional Qualifier. The East Asia-Pacific (EAP) Group A Sub Region Qualifier was conducted and Papua New Guinea and Vanuatu qualified for the EAP Region Qualifier.   

Women's international cricket started off with Bangladesh's tour of South Africa. In the first WODI of New Zealand's tour of Ireland, New Zealand scored a new record total in a WODI innings of 490/4 off 50 overs. The Women's Asia Cup saw a number of upsets occur. Bangladesh advanced to their first Asia Cup final after recording their first wins against India and Pakistan in WT20Is, and Thailand recorded their first victory over a Full Member nation after beating Sri Lanka. Bangladesh went on beat India in the final, to win their first Asia Cup title. In the first WT20I of the Women's T20 Tri-Series in England, New Zealand scored a new record total in a WT20I innings of 216/1 off 20 overs against South Africa. Later the same day, England broke the WT20I record, scoring 250/3, also against South Africa.

Season overview

Rankings

The following are the rankings at the beginning of the season, following the ICC's annual re-weighting.

April

2018 ICC World Cricket League Division Four

Final standings

May

Bangladesh women in South Africa

Pakistan in Ireland

Pakistan in England

Hurricane Relief T20 Challenge

June

Bangladesh vs Afghanistan in India

2018 Women's Twenty20 Asia Cup

Sri Lanka in West Indies

New Zealand women in Ireland

South Africa women in England

England in Scotland

2018 Netherlands Tri-Nation Series

Pakistan in Scotland

Australia in England

Afghanistan in India

2018 England women's Tri-Nation Series

India in Ireland

Bangladesh women in Ireland

July

2018 Zimbabwe Tri-Nation Series

India in England

Bangladesh in West Indies and United States

2018 ICC Women's World Twenty20 Qualifier

Final standings

 Qualified for the 2018 World Twenty20.

New Zealand women in England

South Africa in Sri Lanka

Pakistan in Zimbabwe

2018 MCC Tri-Nation Series

August

Nepal in Netherlands

Afghanistan in Ireland

See also
 Associate international cricket in 2018

References

2018 in cricket
 
2018 sport-related lists